Kibesillah (Pomo: Kabe Sila, meaning "Rock Flat") is an unincorporated community in Mendocino County, California.

A post office operated at Kibesillah from 1874 to 1889.

References

Unincorporated communities in California
Unincorporated communities in Mendocino County, California
Populated coastal places in California